Brzeziny  is a village in the administrative district of Gmina Modliborzyce, within Janów Lubelski County, Lublin Voivodeship, in eastern Poland.

The village has a population of 100.

References

Villages in Janów Lubelski County